Carabodes femoralis is a species of mite in the family Carabodidae. It was originally described as a species of Tegeocranus in 1855 by  Swiss lithographer and entomologist Hercule Nicolet. It feeds on the fruit bodies of the bolete mushroom Boletus badius.

References

Sarcoptiformes
Animals described in 1855
Arachnids of Europe
Arachnids of North America